Otho Robards Singleton (October 14, 1814 – January 11, 1889) was a U.S. Representative from Mississippi and a member of the Confederate States Congress during the American Civil War.

Born near Nicholasville, Kentucky, Singleton attended the common schools. He graduated from St. Joseph's College, Bardstown, Kentucky, and from the law department of the University of Lexington. He was admitted to the bar in 1838 and commenced practice in Canton, Mississippi. He served as member of the State house of representatives in 1846 and 1847. He served in the State senate 1848–1854.

Singleton was elected as a Democrat to the Thirty-third Congress (March 4, 1853 – March 3, 1855). He was an unsuccessful candidate for reelection.

Singleton was elected to the Thirty-fifth and Thirty-sixth Congresses and served from March 4, 1857, until January 12, 1861, when he withdrew. He served as a representative from Mississippi in the First Confederate Congress and Second Confederate Congress from 1861 to 1865.

Singleton was elected as a Democrat to the Forty-fourth and to the five succeeding Congresses (March 4, 1875 – March 3, 1887). He was not a candidate for renomination in 1886. He died in Washington, D.C., January 11, 1889. He was interred in Canton Cemetery, Canton, Mississippi.

References

1814 births
1889 deaths
Members of the Confederate House of Representatives from Mississippi
People from Jessamine County, Kentucky
Democratic Party members of the Mississippi House of Representatives
Democratic Party Mississippi state senators
Democratic Party members of the United States House of Representatives from Mississippi
19th-century American politicians